The 28th Iowa Infantry Regiment was an infantry regiment that served in the Union Army during the American Civil War.

Service
The 28th Iowa Infantry was organized at Iowa City, Iowa and mustered in for three years of Federal service  on October 10, 1862. Iowa circuit court judge  William E. Miller retired from the bench to become the colonel of the regiment at Camp Pope, near Iowa City. For two months they engaged in drilling of recruits, and in November of that year marched through Missouri to an encampment at Helena, Arkansas. The regiment engaged in various expeditions, but Miller "contracted a disease which meant death in the South", which forced him to return to Iowa in March 1863.

The regiment was mustered out on July 31, 1865.

Total strength and casualties
A total of  1195 men served in the 28th Iowa during its existence 
It lost 6 officers and 76 enlisted men to combat action, and 3 officers and 186 enlisted men to disease, for a total of 271 fatalities.

Commanders
 Colonel William E. Miller
 Colonel John Connell

See also
List of Iowa Civil War Units
Iowa in the American Civil War

Notes

References
The Civil War Archive

Units and formations of the Union Army from Iowa
Military units and formations established in 1862
1862 establishments in Iowa
Military units and formations disestablished in 1865